Nicholas Carew may refer to:

 Nicholas Carew (died 1311) of Carew Castle and Moulsford, soldier during reign of Edward I of England
 Sir Nicholas Carew (Lord Privy Seal) (died 1390), Lord Privy Seal during the reign of Edward III of England
 Nicholas Carew (died 1432), Member of Parliament and sheriff for Surrey
 Nicholas Carew (courtier) (1496–1539), courtier and statesman during the reign of Henry VIII of England
 Nicholas Throckmorton (alias Carew) (died 1644), Member of Parliament for Lyme Regis in 1601 and Surrey in 1621
 Nicholas Carew (1635–1688), Member of Parliament for Gatton, 1664–1685
 Sir Nicholas Carew, 1st Baronet (1687–1727), Member of Parliament for Haslemere, 1708–1710 and 1714–1722, and Surrey, 1722–1727

See also
 Carew (disambiguation)